was a Japanese video game development company founded in 1989 in Tokyo, Japan by Takashi Yoneda, who was previously employed by Technos Japan and Enix.  The company was originally established under the name Almanic Corporation, which it operated under for a few years before changing its corporate name in 1995. Givro would go on to produce games for home consoles such as the Super Nintendo Entertainment System, Sega Genesis, 32X, Nintendo 64 and Sega Saturn. Givro released their final game in late 1997 and quietly dissolved at the end of the following year.

History

Origins

As Almanic Corp.

As Givro Corp.

Closure

Games

Notes

References

External links 
 Givro Corporation at MobyGames

Defunct video game companies of Japan
Software companies based in Tokyo
Video game companies established in 1989
Video game companies disestablished in 1998
Video game development companies